Jesenje is a municipality in the Krapina-Zagorje County in Croatia. In the 2011 census, there were a total of 1,560 inhabitants. The absolute majority of the population are Croats at 99.36%. The population is distributed in the following settlements:
 Brdo Jesenjsko, population 169
 Cerje Jesenjsko, population 158
 Donje Jesenje, population 359
 Gornje Jesenje, population 749
 Lužani Zagorski, population 125

References

Populated places in Krapina-Zagorje County
Municipalities of Croatia